Ampelovirus is a genus of viruses, in the family Closteroviridae. Plants serve as natural hosts. There are 13 species in this genus. Diseases associated with this genus include: yellowing and necrosis, particularly affecting the phloem.

Taxonomy
The following species are assigned to the genus:
 Air potato ampelovirus 1
 Blackberry vein banding-associated virus
 Grapevine leafroll-associated virus 1
 Grapevine leafroll-associated virus 3
 Grapevine leafroll-associated virus 4
 Grapevine leafroll-associated virus 13
 Little cherry virus 2
 Pineapple mealybug wilt-associated virus 1
 Pineapple mealybug wilt-associated virus 2
 Pineapple mealybug wilt-associated virus 3
 Pistachio ampelovirus A
 Plum bark necrosis stem pitting-associated virus
 Yam asymptomatic virus 1

Structure
Viruses in the genus Ampelovirus are non-enveloped, with flexuous and  Filamentous geometries. The diameter is around 10-13 nm, with a length of 1400-2200 nm. Genomes are linear, around 17.9kb in length. The genome codes for 13 proteins.

Life cycle
Viral replication is cytoplasmic. Entry into the host cell is achieved by penetration into the host cell. Replication follows the positive stranded RNA virus replication model. The virus exits the host cell by tubule-guided viral movement. Plants serve as the natural host. Transmission routes are mechanical.

References

External links

 ICTV Report: Closteroviridae
 Viralzone: Ampelovirus

Closteroviridae
Virus genera